The 2021 Miami Hurricanes baseball team represents the University of Miami during the 2021 NCAA Division I baseball season. The Hurricanes will play their home games at Alex Rodriguez Park at Mark Light Field as a member of the Atlantic Coast Conference. They are led by head coach Gino DiMare, in his 3rd season at Miami.

Previous season

The 2020 Miami Hurricanes baseball team notched a 12–4 (3–0) regular season record. The season prematurely ended on March 12, 2020 due to concerns over the COVID-19 pandemic.

Game log

2021 MLB draft

References

External links 
 Miami Hurricanes baseball

Miami Hurricanes
Miami Hurricanes baseball seasons
Miami Hurricanes baseball
Miami